is a retired Japanese triple jumper. He competed at the 1956, 1960 and 1964 Olympics with the best achievement of seventh place in 1956. His personal best was 16.18 m, set in 1963.

References

1936 births
Living people
Japanese male triple jumpers
Olympic male triple jumpers
Olympic athletes of Japan
Athletes (track and field) at the 1956 Summer Olympics
Athletes (track and field) at the 1960 Summer Olympics
Athletes (track and field) at the 1964 Summer Olympics
Asian Games gold medalists for Japan
Asian Games silver medalists for Japan
Asian Games gold medalists in athletics (track and field)
Athletes (track and field) at the 1958 Asian Games
Athletes (track and field) at the 1962 Asian Games
Medalists at the 1958 Asian Games
Medalists at the 1962 Asian Games
Universiade medalists in athletics (track and field)
Universiade silver medalists for Japan
Medalists at the 1959 Summer Universiade
Japan Championships in Athletics winners